Elín Ebba Gunnarsdóttir is an Icelandic writer born in 1953. She is noted for her short fiction.

Her publications include Sumar sögur : smásögur (Some Stories,) and Ysta brún : smásögur (On The Edge, Vaka-Helgafell,).

Her story "Solmundur" was included in Gerd Schmidt Nielsen's 1999 collection Nordiske noveller i 1990'erne (Nordic short stories in the 1990s, Systime,).

References

 

1953 births
Living people
Elin Ebba Gunnarsdottir
Elin Ebba Gunnarsdottir